A Dictionary of Greek and Roman Antiquities is an English language encyclopedia first published in 1842. The second, improved and enlarged, edition appeared in 1848, and there were many revised editions up to 1890. The encyclopedia covered law, religion, architecture, warfare, daily life, and similar subjects primarily from the standpoint of a classicist. It was one of a series of reference works on classical antiquity by William Smith, the others cover persons and places. It runs to well over a million words in any edition, and all editions are now in the public domain.

See also
 Dictionary of Greek and Roman Geography
 Dictionary of Greek and Roman Biography and Mythology

References and sources
References

Sources

External links

 1870 edition, OCR at Ancient Library
 1875 edition at LacusCurtius (about 50% of it: the Roman articles)
 1890 edition at Perseus Project
Also the Internet Archive has a derivative work:

1842 non-fiction books
British online encyclopedias
Reference works in the public domain